Arnold Wilson (22 September 1885 – 8 April 1971) was an Australian rules footballer who played for the St Kilda Football Club in the Victorian Football League (VFL).

Notes

External links 

1885 births
1971 deaths
VFL/AFL players born in England
Australian rules footballers from Victoria (Australia)
St Kilda Football Club players